Greta is a small town in the Hunter Region of New South Wales, Australia.

History
The traditional owners and custodians of the Maitland area are the Wonnarua people. The Greta area was first colonized by Europeans around Anvil Creek in the 1830s. 

When the town was surveyed in 1842 it was given the name Greta, possibly after a small river in Cumberland, England.  Coal mining was established in the area in 1862 with the development of a railway station. 

In 1864, kerosene shale was discovered.  By the 1870s, Greta had four hotels, four churches, a school and schools of arts.  Geologist Edgeworth David discovered the Greta Coal Seam in 1886.  By 1907 ten collieries were in operation. 

At the 2016 census the town had a population of 2,830.

Greta Army Camp

The Greta Army Camp, located on the town's outskirts, was opened in 1939 as a training ground for World War II soldier training, and in 1949 was transferred to the Department of Immigration who transformed it into one of Australia's largest migrant reception and training centres between June 1949 and January 1960 as part of the post-war immigration to Australia. Over 100,000 new migrants seeking a new life in Australia passed through Greta Camp throughout its 11-years in operation.

Transport
Access to Sydney will be possible via the Hunter Expressway when it is completed. NSW TrainLink's Hunter Line passes through Greta railway station, which opened in 1869.

Heritage listings
Greta has the Greta railway station.

Images of Greta

Notes

References

External links

 

suburbs of City of Cessnock
suburbs of Maitland, New South Wales